Reepham High School and College is a secondary school and sixth form with academy status located in Reepham, a small market town in the English county of Norfolk. It is a specialist Science, Applied Learning and Mathematics & Computing centre and has around 1050 pupils on roll. The majority of the students live in outlying villages. Prior to September 2009, when Reepham College opened, it was known as Reepham High School. Tim Gibbs is the current principal, taking over from Mark Farrar in 2017.

History 
The school opened with around 200 pupils in 1961 as a secondary modern school. The first head was Edward Riddell Smith.

College

History 
The college, which was previously an 11 to 16 school, added a sixth form in 2009 with a £6,000,000 sixth-form centre investment. A new £280,000 playing field, predominantly used for sporting activities, and additional science classrooms have also been added in recent years. In the next few years, the school could gain a new sports hall as part of a local housing development programme. A new languages block was finished in September 2016.

Ofsted and Specialisation
In 2006, the Eastern Daily Press reported that Reepham High - a Comprehensive secondary school under Local Authority control - was the only school in Norfolk to carry Ofsted's “Outstanding” ranking. In September 2008, the school was ranked “Outstanding” for a third time, and the school scored the highest overall grade possible.

After converting to Academy status (in 2012) the school subsequently lost its "outstanding" rating in the OFSTED inspection of May 2013.

Since 2006 the school has been a specialist Science, Mathematics and Vocational school.

Notable alumni

High school 

 Aston Villa goalkeeper Jed Steer
 Carl Rogers, captain of Norfolk County Cricket Club from 2009 to 2010.
 Bruce Fielder (a.k.a. Sigala)
 Iona Lake (steeplechaser)

References

Secondary schools in Norfolk
Educational institutions established in 1961
1961 establishments in England
Academies in Norfolk
Reepham, Norfolk